Erpeldange is a small town in the commune of Bous, in south-eastern Luxembourg.  , the town has a population of 323.

Towns in Luxembourg
Remich (canton)